Journey of Dreams may refer to:

 Nights: Journey of Dreams, a video game by Sega Studio USA
 Journey of Dreams (album), an album by Ladysmith Black Mambazo